Mama Drama is a ten-episode reality television series that focuses on five mother-daughter pairs who are put together in a penthouse in Las Vegas, Nevada.

Cast

Episodes

References

External links

2012 American television series debuts
English-language television shows
Television shows set in the Las Vegas Valley
VH1 original programming
2010s American reality television series
2012 American television series endings